Namoliki Sualiki Neemia, generally referred to as Namoliki Sualiki, is a Tuvaluan politician.

He obtained a Master of Education degree at James Cook University in Queensland, Australia, in 1994. His thesis, entitled "Learning for life: up to and beyond the year 2000", explored the social aspects of education and education planning in Tuvalu. He became a teacher. In 2003, he published a booklet entitled Tuvalu Technical Vocational Education and Training, with the government of Tuvalu and NZAID. The same year, he was appointed Member of the Order of the British Empire (MBE) for public and community service.

In 2006, he went into politics, and was elected to Parliament as MP for Nukulaelae. He was re-elected in the 2010 general election, and Prime Minister Maatia Toafa appointed him Minister for Education, Youth and Sport. He lost office just three months later, when Toafa's government was brought down by a motion of no confidence.

Namoliki Sualiki was appointed Minister for Home Affairs and Rural Development on 5 August 2013; and served as the minister during the Sopoaga Ministry. He was re-elected in the 2019 general election.

He was appointed Officer of the Order of the British Empire (OBE) in the 2016 New Year Honours.

References

Government ministers of Tuvalu
Members of the Parliament of Tuvalu
People from Nukulaelae
Officers of the Order of the British Empire
Living people
James Cook University alumni
Year of birth missing (living people)